Drown Out is a studio album by American electronic music producer Daedelus. It was released on Anticon in 2013.

Critical reception
At Metacritic, which assigns a weighted average score out of 100 to reviews from mainstream critics, the album received an average score of 66% based on 7 reviews, indicating "generally favorable reviews".

Jason Lymangrover of AllMusic gave the album 3.5 stars out of 5, saying: "It's the type of album that will be most apt to impress aspiring producers, but also hip enough that it could serve as a backing soundtrack for a dinner party too." Bram E. Gieben of The Skinny gave the album 4 stars out of 5, calling it "another fantastic album from a genuinely unique producer."

Track listing

Personnel
Credits adapted from liner notes.

 Daedelus – composition, performance
 Amir Yaghmai – vocals (3, 12), guitar (12)
 Laura Darlington – vocals (3)
 Hrishikesh Hirway – vocals (3)
 Pete Curry – drums (3, 9, 12)
 Andres Renteria – drums (3)
 Louis Cole – drums (4)
 Adam Benjamin – keyboards (5)
 Chris Alfaro – skateboards (9)
 Phil Nisco – skateboards (9)
 Sunny Graves – composition (10), performance (10)
 Kelli Cain – vocals (11), keyboards (11)
 John Tejada – mastering
 Ghostshrimp – artwork
 Low Limit – layout

References

Further reading

External links
 

2013 albums
Daedelus (musician) albums
Anticon albums